The Fisheries Convention or the London Fisheries Convention is an international agreement signed in London in relation to fishing rights across the coastal waters of Western Europe, in particular the fishing rights in the North Sea, in the Skagerrak, in the Kattegat and on the European Atlantic coast. It gives right of full access to the fishing grounds between 6 and 12 nautical miles of the national coastline to the fishing industry of those contracting parties that had already been fishing there in the period 1953–1962.

This agreement is largely superseded to the Common Fisheries Policy (the CFP), as all parties are members of the European Union.

Background and negotiations
Between Belgium, Denmark, France, Germany, Netherlands, United Kingdom the "International Convention for regulating the police of the North Sea fisheries outside territorial waters" (the North Sea Fisheries Convention) of 1888 applied which allowed fishing in each other's waters up to 3 miles from the coast line. The United Kingdom denounced this convention in 1963 in order to allow setting up a 12-mile exclusive fishery zone. After denunciation it invited the parties to that convention and several others to negotiate on several issues related to fisheries, which resulted in the Fisheries Convention.

Negotiations took place between the parties of the European Economic Communities, the European Free Trade Association, the Commission of the EEC, as well as Iceland, Ireland and Norway.

Parties
The convention has 12 parties, while 1 signatory (Luxembourg) signed but did not ratify.

Poland is a non-signatory which acceded to the convention after its entry into force.

Denunciation and withdrawal
The convention can be denounced after the passage of 20 years from its entry into force, subject to a two-year notice period.

On 2 July 2017 the United Kingdom Government announced that it would withdraw from the Fisheries Convention. Formal notice of the "denunciation" was given the next day, 3 July 2017. The denunciation took effect at the end of the transition phase on 31 December 2020 at 11 pm GMT.

See also
Brexit
Common Fisheries Policy
North Sea Fisheries Convention

References

External links
treaty text

Treaties concluded in 1964
Treaties entered into force in 1966
Treaties of Belgium
Treaties of France
Treaties of Germany
Treaties of Ireland
Treaties of Italy
Treaties of Spain
Treaties of Poland
Treaties of Portugal
Treaties of Sweden
Treaties of the Netherlands
Treaties extended to West Berlin
Fisheries treaties